The 2008 season was the Kansas City Chiefs' 39th in the National Football League (NFL), their 49th overall, and their third and final season under head coach Herm Edwards at the helm. The Chiefs failed to improve on their 4–12 record from 2007 with the youngest team in the NFL as part of their "youth movement". The season turned out to be the worst in the franchise's history at the time, by tallying 13 losses for the first time ever. The Chiefs' record tied with the St. Louis Rams where they stood 2–14.

The Chiefs' 2008 season began with a 1–10 record, with the franchise losing 19 of 20 games over a two-year period. The team lost seven games by 7 points or less, two games by 24-point margins, suffered a 34–0 shutout to the Carolina Panthers, and allowed a franchise-high 54 points against the Buffalo Bills. Following a 22–21 loss to the Chargers, a game in which Kansas City allowed two touchdowns and lost an 11-point lead in the game's final minutes, Chiefs owner Clark Hunt announced the resignation of General Manager/Vice President/CEO Carl Peterson effective at the end of the season. The Chiefs suffered instability on offense with rotation at the quarterback position and offensive gameplans, and also on defense after trading DE Jared Allen to the Minnesota Vikings. After trading Allen, who led the NFL in sacks in 2007, the Chiefs got 10 sacks on the season, setting a new NFL record for fewest sacks in a 16-game season.

The Chiefs reorganized their offense to focus around quarterback Brodie Croyle, but his season-ending injury in Week 7 led to a new spread offense gameplan focused around Tyler Thigpen. His passer rating climbed from 44.3 to 76.9 in the five games following his initial start at Atlanta. The Chiefs scored more than 10 points just twice in their first six games, but scored more offensive points than that in every game since, and twice topped 25 points. The Chiefs won their first game with the new offense against the Raiders in Week 13.

The season was the twelfth and final season in Kansas City for long-time Chiefs tight end Tony Gonzalez, who was traded to the Atlanta Falcons after the season.

Offseason
Beginning with the 2008 season, the team's Lamar Hunt/American Football League tribute patch which was introduced in the 2007 season became a permanent part of the Chiefs' uniform.

Coaching and roster changes

Following the Chiefs loss to the New York Jets in the 2007 season finale, general manager Carl Peterson announced that both he and head coach Herman Edwards would return to the Chiefs in 2008. However, team chairman Clark Hunt—who took over leadership of the Chiefs in late 2006 after the death of his father, team founder Lamar Hunt—declined to immediately comment on Peterson's status. Hunt spoke out weeks later and stated that the Chiefs were his "No. 1 priority" and that "to have the best chance of success in 2008, having Carl here makes a lot of sense." Hunt wanted to avoid having a new general manager come in with a new head coach, and starting from scratch again. Edwards and Peterson were considered to be on the hot seat by the press, but inside the team, both were considered to be safe unless absolutely zero progress was made in 2008. Clark Hunt had expressed his expectations of a winning Chiefs team earning a playoff berth in 2008.

On January 1, the Chiefs fired offensive coordinator Mike Solari after two unproductive seasons.
Offensive line coach John Matsko, receivers coach Charlie Joiner and running backs coach James Saxon were fired as well after a season in which the Chiefs were among the worst offensive teams in the NFL. Tight ends coach Jon Embree and assistant head coach/quarterbacks coach Dick Curl were the only offensive assistants who were retained.

For offensive coordinator, the Chiefs interviewed Chan Gailey, Paul Hackett, Eric Price, Mike Shula, and Jim Fassel. Both Shula and Gailey were interviewed twice. Gailey was hired on January 16. Price was later added as the team's wide receivers coach.

In addition to Gailey, the Chiefs added Bob Bicknell as their offensive line coach, and Joe D'Alessandris assistant offensive line coach. Curtis Modkins, from Gailey's staff at Georgia Tech, was added as the team's running backs coach.

By releasing several veteran players, the Chiefs began their youth movement. Overall, the 2008 Chiefs were the NFL's youngest at an average of 25.9 years of age. They had the youngest starting lineup at 25.5.

Free agency
The Chiefs had 9 unrestricted free agents heading into the 2008 off-season.

Additions
In February, Kansas City claimed OT Anthony Alabi off waivers from the Miami Dolphins. Kansas City also agreed to two-year contracts with K Nick Novak, S Erick Harris, DT T.J. Jackson, CB Chad Johnson, OT Joe Lobdell, and G Rob Smith.

In March, Kansas City claimed FB Oliver Hoyte off waivers from the Dallas Cowboys. The team also signed free agent LB Demorrio Williams, and WR Devard Darling.

In April, Kansas City signed KR B.J. Sams, TE John Paul Foschi and C Wade Smith.

In May, the Chiefs signed a total of 23 undrafted free agents. and cornerbacks Will Poole and Jason Horton.

In August, the Chiefs signed K Jay Feely but released him the following day.

In September, the Chiefs signed QB Ingle Martin following an injury to Brodie Croyle.

In October, the Chiefs re-signed K Connor Barth, who was released at the beginning of the season at the 53-man roster deadline. Kansas City also signed QB Quinn Gray following a season-ending injury to starting QB Brodie Croyle. A slew of injuries to the Chiefs' starting lineup in October and November made the team sign several players in order to fill holes.

Departures
In February, the Chiefs released WR Eddie Kennison, OT John Welbourn, RB Gilbert Harris, DE Khreem Smith, CB Ty Law, LB Kendrell Bell, TE Jason Dunn, DT James Reed, and OT Chris Bober. After attempting to trade him for the second consecutive year, the Chiefs released FS Greg Wesley in July. In October, Kansas City released LB Napoleon Harris, and K Nick Novak.

Failed signings
The Chiefs were as aggressive as NFL rules allowed them to be in pursuing of C Jeff Faine and K Josh Brown, both of whom signed with teams on the first day of free agency. NFL rules prohibit teams from contacting prospective free agents or their agents until free agency begins. In 2008, that time was 11 p.m. on February 28. "There were probably some deals done before (the start of the league year)", Edwards said when asked why the Chiefs didn't get in the game with either player. "We didn't cheat. We abided by the rules. That's how you're supposed to do it, and that's what we did."

Entering the season, the Chiefs were unsure if injury-prone Brodie Croyle could be their quarterback of the future. Following the season-ending injury to QB Croyle, the Chiefs contacted recently retired QB Daunte Culpepper and free agent QB Bruce Gradkowski. Culpepper acted as his own agent and asked for "preposterous" contract terms, which caused many teams to cancel talks, including Kansas City. Culpepper agreed to meet with the Chiefs on October 28 for a physical and face-to-face negotiations but canceled the meeting in favor of other opportunities with the NFL.

Jared Allen trade

In February, the Chiefs placed the franchise tag on DE Jared Allen to prevent him from hitting the free agent market before the teams agree on a long-term deal. In April, reports surfaced detailing a proposed trade between Kansas City and the Minnesota Vikings which would send Allen to Minnesota in exchange for additional selections in the 2008 NFL Draft. Other teams that had contacted Allen's agent include the Tampa Bay Buccaneers and the Jacksonville Jaguars. The Philadelphia Eagles also proposed a trade with Kansas City. Allen was not tagged as an exclusive rights franchise player and had the right to visit and negotiate with other teams.

Chiefs general manager Carl Peterson's relationship with Allen had been strained ever since Peterson, in the wake of Allen's DUI convictions, described him as "a young man at risk." Allen, who could be suspended for a season if he has another alcohol-related episode, had said he would not negotiate with Kansas City if he did not get a contract done by July 2009. Allen had previously voiced his wish to stay with the Chiefs.

On April 22, the Chiefs and Vikings reached an agreement on a trade package, and at roughly the same time, Allen reached an agreement in principle on a contract with the Vikings. Upon reaching the contract agreement, Allen headed to the airport and left for Minnesota.

Sources said the Vikings included a second third-round pick (No. 73) in the 2008 draft to get the deal done. They had been offering a No. 1 pick (17th in the first round) and a No. 3 (No. 82). The teams also swapped spots in the sixth round with the Vikings getting a better spot in the sixth round, sources said.

2008 NFL draft
The Chiefs chose fifth overall in the 2008 NFL Draft. A coin flip held at the NFL Scouting Combine determined the tie-breaker between the Chiefs, Falcons, and Raiders. The Chiefs had a league-high 13 selections heading into the draft.

Kansas City was interested in defensive end Chris Long following the departure of Jared Allen, but ended up with Glenn Dorsey after he slipped to #5 overall. Kansas City had Dorsey rated higher than Long, despite not having an immediate need at the position. Regardless of concern from NFL scouts about a previous leg injury to Dorsey which may cause him to get surgery in the near future, Kansas City selected Dorsey fifth overall. Dorsey and OT Branden Albert, Kansas City's other first-round selection, were considered by some to be the best players in the entire Draft.

Several analysts considered Kansas City to have made the best draft selections of any team. Kansas City also received the largest rookie pool to pay their 12 rookies, with a sum of $8,221,790, due in part to their two selections in the top 15 of the NFL Draft.

Notes:
 Obtained Minnesota's first round selection (#17), and two third round selections (#73, #82) in exchange for DE Jared Allen. The teams also swapped sixth round selections (Kansas City moved from #187 to #182).
 Obtained Miami's fifth round selection (#136) in exchange for QB Trent Green. The selection was later traded to Detroit.
 Obtained Tampa Bay's sixth round selection (#187) in exchange for RB Michael Bennett. The selection was later swapped with Minnesota.
 Obtained New York's seventh round selection (#239) in exchange for K Lawrence Tynes.
 (Draft day trade) Obtained Detroit's first round selection (#15) and third round selection (#76) in exchange for the Chiefs' first round selection (#17), third round selection (#66) and fifth round selection (#136).

Roster

Staff

Preseason

Training camp
The Chiefs departed for training camp at the University of Wisconsin–River Falls on July 24 and broke camp on August 15. The 2008 training camp session marked the Chiefs' 18th season in River Falls, Wisconsin. Prior to the start of the season, Kansas City named Patrick Surtain, Pat Thomas, Brian Waters, and Jon McGraw as team captains.

Exhibition games
The Chiefs played the Chicago Bears on August 7 and their offense was very consistent. They won the game 24–20 and had their first victory in the pre-season since August 2006. The team lost to the Arizona Cardinals by a score of 27–17 at Arrowhead Stadium on August 16. The Chiefs were shut out by the Miami Dolphins at Dolphin Stadium by a score of 24–0 on August 23. Kansas City played its final pre-season game against the St. Louis Rams on August 28 at Arrowhead Stadium for the Missouri Governor's Cup. The Chiefs won the game 21–17.

Schedule

Regular season

Schedule
The 2008 NFL season schedule was released on April 15. The Chiefs were reportedly one of the four teams being considered to play an international regular season game in London in 2008. Among the Chiefs, the Tampa Bay Buccaneers, New Orleans Saints, and Seattle Seahawks were in consideration. The Chargers and Saints were later chosen instead.

Note: Intra-division opponents are in bold text.

Game summaries

Week 1: at New England Patriots

The Chiefs played the defending AFC Champion New England Patriots, and were 16 ½-point underdogs entering the game. With 7:20 left in the first quarter, safety Bernard Pollard hit quarterback Tom Brady in his left leg. Brady went down, clutching his left knee and would not return to play in the game. Backup quarterback Matt Cassel entered the game, and his first pass of the game went 51 yards to wide receiver Randy Moss. Cassel continued to excel as he was 5–6 on the drive. It ended on a 10-yard touchdown pass to Moss, giving the heavily favored Patriots the early lead in the second quarter. Five drives later the Chiefs got on the scoreboard after a 13-play drive that ended on a 40-yard field goal from kicker Nick Novak. However, New England replied with their second touchdown of the day, this time a 5-yard run by running back Sammy Morris. Chiefs quarterback Brodie Croyle was hurt when he was sacked and slammed to the turf on his shoulder. With around 50 seconds on the clock and down by a touchdown in the fourth quarter, the Chiefs had the ball near the Patriots goal line. Kansas City had a chance to score but Dwayne Bowe dropped a pass in the end zone on fourth down, resulting in a Patriots victory. The loss also gave them a franchise-worst 10-straight losses, dating back to last season. Croyle tried to throw on the sideline, but immediately indicated he was through for the day. Damon Huard substituted for Croyle and had the Chiefs on the 5-yard line when they ran out of downs. The Patriots won the game 17–10, and the Chiefs fell to an 0–1 start.

Week 2: vs. Oakland Raiders

Hoping to rebound from their tough road loss to the Patriots, the Chiefs hosted their AFC West rival, the Oakland Raiders.  In the first quarter, Kansas City trailed early as Raiders kicker Sebastian Janikowski got a 56-yard and a 25-yard field goal. Chiefs quarterback Damon Huard suffered a neck injury in the first quarter and Tyler Thigpen substituted as quarterback for the remainder of the game. Huard was in for Kansas City's first two series, but didn't return after throwing an interception late in the second quarter. Marques Hagans, who was listed on the Chiefs' roster as a wide receiver, checked in as quarterback for several draw plays. The Chiefs announced at the end of the third quarter that Huard sustained "mild head trauma," a move deemed controversial as Huard never sought medical attention in the following days.

Under Thigpen, the Chiefs' offense struggled to move the ball down the field. In using three quarterbacks, the Chiefs had only 65 net yards at halftime. Raiders RB Darren McFadden got a 19-yard TD run in the third quarter. Oakland increased its lead with Janikowski nailing a 40-yard field goal in the fourth quarter. The Chiefs would respond with rookie QB Tyler Thigpen completing a 2-yard TD pass to TE Tony Gonzalez, Kansas City executed a two-point conversion pass to rookie FB Mike Cox to make them within 8 points with just over five minutes remaining. The Chiefs' two-point conversion was the team's first in two years. Kansas City lost its opportunity to tie the game as the Raiders pulled away with RB Michael Bush getting a 32-yard TD run.

The Chiefs' defense allowed the third-highest total yards on offense in franchise history. JaMarcus Russell completed only 6 of 17 passes for 55 yards and led the Raiders to a 15-point victory. Following the game, Chiefs RB Larry Johnson voiced his displeasure with the Chiefs' offense and his role with the team. With the loss, the Chiefs fell to an 0–2 record for the third consecutive year. Kansas City's 11-game losing streak (2007–2008) is the longest in franchise history. The Chiefs also lost their second consecutive game to the Raiders for the first time since 2001.

Week 3: at Atlanta Falcons

Trying to snap a two-game losing skid, the Chiefs played a Week 3 interconference duel against the Atlanta Falcons. With Damon Huard still recovering, second-year quarterback Tyler Thigpen was given the start.

In the first quarter, Kansas City's struggled as Falcons RB Michael Turner got a 4-yard TD run, along with QB Matt Ryan completing a 70-yard TD pass to WR Roddy White. In the second quarter, Atlanta increased its lead with kicker Jason Elam getting a 27-yard field goal, along with Turner's 1-yard TD run. The Chiefs would close out the first half with Thigpen completing a 15-yard TD pass to WR Dwayne Bowe.

In the third quarter, Kansas City closed in on Atlanta's lead as RB Larry Johnson got a 1-yard TD run. However, the Falcons replied with Turner's 2-yard TD run, and a fourth quarter interception sealed the win when CB Chris Houston returned it 10 yards for a touchdown.

With their twelfth consecutive loss, the Chiefs fell to 0–3.

Week 4: vs. Denver Broncos

The Chiefs hosted the 3–0 Broncos in hopes of winning their first game of the season. The Chiefs' offense, averaging fewer than 11 points a game, turned early touchdown opportunities into short field goals.

In its first two possessions, Denver's league-leading offense had a turnover, a sack and a shanked punt. Larry Johnson ran a career-long 65-yard run to the 21 yard line on the game's second play. Kansas City had first-and-goal from the 9, but only managed a field goal. The field goal gave Kansas City their first lead in 22 quarters, since the team's lead against the Titans on December 16, 2007.

With QB Damon Huard at the helm, the Chiefs' offense allowed no turnovers and scored more points in one game (33) than their first three games of the season combined (32). Denver's running defense was noticeably weak and allowed Chiefs RB Larry Johnson to run for 198 yards. Johnson also tallied his first 2 touchdown game in over two years. Denver allowed four turnovers, which the Chiefs capitalized on three. Chiefs TE Tony Gonzalez scored one touchdown and finished the game within three yards shy of tying Shannon Sharpe's all-time receiving record (10,060).

The win was Kansas City's first since a victory over Oakland on October 21, 2007. Johnson tallied his 29th career 100-yard rushing game and his fifth against Denver.

Week 5: at Carolina Panthers

Coming off their stunning home win over the Broncos, the Chiefs flew to Bank of America Stadium for a Week 5 interconference duel with the Carolina Panthers. In the first quarter, Kansas City trailed as RB DeAngelo Williams got a 10-yard TD run. In the second quarter, the Chiefs continued to trail as Williams caught a 25-yard TD pass from QB Jake Delhomme, along with getting a 32-yard TD run. In the third quarter, Carolina kicker John Kasay made a 32-yard field goal, along with Delhomme completing a 47-yard TD pass to WR Muhsin Muhammad. In the fourth quarter, the Panthers sealed the win with Kasay nailing a 43-yard field goal. TE Tony Gonzalez (3 receptions for 17 yards) became the NFL's all-time leader in career receiving yards for a tight end with 10,063 yards.

With the shutout loss, the Chiefs fell to 1–4.

Bye Week: Gonzalez and Johnson controversies

TE Tony Gonzalez met with Chiefs GM Carl Peterson during the bye week and inquired about a trade to a playoff contender. Gonzalez, who had always said he would like to end his career with the Chiefs, voiced his desire to play for a Super Bowl contending team and the rebuilding Chiefs would like to acquire extra draft picks. Buffalo, Atlanta, Green Bay, Philadelphia, and the New York Giants had been in contact with the Chiefs regarding Gonzalez. The Giants were considered to be the front-runners, but showed "lukewarm" interest. The Packers offered a third round draft choice, but the deal was not finalized, and Gonzalez remained with the Chiefs after the trading deadline passed.

RB Larry Johnson was charged with simple assault for allegedly pushing a woman at a Kansas City nightclub in February, the third time he has faced assault charges against a woman. Johnson was also reportedly offered by the Chiefs for a trade. Days later, coach Herm Edwards ruled Johnson out of the Chiefs' upcoming game against Tennessee as a result of a violation of team rules. Edwards stated that it was not in response to Johnson's legal troubles, but instead of insubordination.

Days later, reports surfaced that Johnson was under investigation for allegedly telling a woman that he was going to kill her boyfriend then spat in her face at Kansas City's Club Blonde on October 10, just four days prior to his court hearing for a separate incident. Johnson's pattern of behavior could lead to a possible suspension under the NFL's personal conduct policy. Johnson made a public apology on October 22. As a result of his October 10 incident, Johnson was de-activated for the Chiefs' game against the New York Jets. As a result, Johnson was charged with simple assault for the second time in two weeks. The Chiefs indicated that Johnson would meet with NFL commissioner Roger Goodell and would not play "for the foreseeable future." Goodell subsequently suspended Johnson for the Chiefs' Week 10 game against the Chargers.

Week 7: vs. Tennessee Titans

Coming off their bye week, the Chiefs went home for a Week 7 duel with the undefeated Tennessee Titans. In the first quarter, Kansas City trailed early as Titans kicker Rob Bironas got a 49-yard field goal, along with RB LenDale White getting a 6-yard TD run. In the second quarter, Tennessee increased its lead with White getting a 2-yard TD run. In the third quarter, the Chiefs continued to struggle as Bironas got a 46-yard field goal. In the fourth quarter, the Titans began to put the game out of reach as White got an 80-yard TD run. Kansas City would finally get on the board as kicker Nick Novak got a 26-yard field goal. Tennessee would seal the win as RB Chris Johnson got a 66-yard TD run. The Chiefs would end the game with QB Tyler Thigpen getting a 14-yard TD run.

With the loss, Kansas City fell to 1–5.

During the game starting QB Brodie Croyle (9/10 for 63 yards) suffered a sprained knee in the second quarter. Also, veteran QB Damon Huard (9/16 for 96 yards) later left the game in the fourth with an injured thumb. Both would be placed on injured reserve, ending their seasons.

Implementing the spread offense

To help Tyler Thigpen prepare for the game against the Jets, the Chiefs implemented the spread offense to help Thigpen and the rest of the younger players play to the best of their abilities, and also following the absence of RB Larry Johnson due to suspension. The Chiefs made a huge gamble by doing so, as most in the NFL believe that a spread offense cannot work in professional football, and also head coach Herman Edwards was traditionally in favor of more conservative, run-oriented game plans. Prior to the Chiefs implementing the spread offense, Thigpen had been playing erratically with the Chiefs, and he suddenly became poised and effective running the new offense.

Week 8: at New York Jets

Hoping to rebound from their loss to the Titans, the Chiefs flew to The Meadowlands for a Week 8 duel with the New York Jets.  Due to the season-ending injuries to QB's Brodie Croyle and Damon Huard, Tyler Thigpen made his second career start. Thigpen became the starting quarterback by default.

In the first quarter, Kansas City trailed early as Jets QB Brett Favre completed an 18-yard TD pass to RB Leon Washington.  In the second quarter, the Chiefs tied the game as Thigpen completed a 19-yard TD pass to TE Tony Gonzalez.  New York responded with Washington getting a 60-yard TD run, yet Kansas City closed out the half with Thigpen completed an 11-yard TD pass to WR Mark Bradley.

In the third quarter, the Chiefs took the lead as rookie kicker Connor Barth nailed a 30-yard field goal, yet the Jets regained the lead with RB Thomas Jones getting a 1-yard TD run.  In the fourth quarter, Kansas City took the lead again as rookie CB Brandon Flowers returned an interception 91 yards for a touchdown.  However, New York got the last laugh as Favre completed a 15-yard TD pass to WR Laveranues Coles.

With the loss, the Chiefs fell to 1–6.

Week 9: vs. Tampa Bay Buccaneers

The game started well for the Chiefs who jumped out to a 24–3 lead, which included a "trick" touchdown pass from Mark Bradley (wide receiver) to Tyler Thigpen (quarterback).  The momentum started to change when the Buccaneers ran a punt return for a touchdown and added a late field goal to cut the deficit to a 24–13 margin.  In the fourth quarter, Tampa Bay picked up a late touchdown on a fumble to bring the game to a 27–25 deficit.  They converted the two-point conversion to tie the game at 27–27.  In overtime, the Buccaneers systematically ran the ball to the 30-yard line and then kicked the winning field goal to capture a 30–27 victory.  It was the biggest margin they have overcome in their history.  The loss was the Chiefs' 16th in the past 17 games.

With their 4th-straight loss, Kansas City fell to 1–7.

Week 10: at San Diego Chargers

The Chiefs took an early lead on a 30-yard pass from Tyler Thigpen to Mark Bradley.  The Chiefs defense continued to show improvement in the red zone, limiting the Chargers to two field goals instead of two touchdowns.  At the end of the first half, Thigpen threw a pass to 34 yard touchdown pass to Tony Gonzalez. However, the extra point snap was botched and an attempt at a quick pass failed.

The Chargers controlled the second half better than the first, scoring two touchdowns and leading the Chiefs by 7 at the end of the fourth quarter.  The Chiefs' final drive ended with a 3-yard touchdown pass to Gonzalez. A 1-point PAT would tie the game. However, Herm Edwards told Thigpen to go for two, explaining in a post-game interview that the defense was too beat up for overtime play.  The resulting two-point conversion ended in an incomplete pass.  The Chiefs lost by one point.

With the loss, Kansas City fell to 1–8.

Week 11: vs. New Orleans Saints

Hoping to snap their five-game losing streak, the Chiefs went home for a Week 11 interconference duel with the New Orleans Saints.  In the first quarter, Kansas City struck first as QB Tyler Thigpen completed a 6-yard TD pass to WR Dwayne Bowe.  The Saints would respond with kicker Garrett Hartley getting a 30-yard field goal.  In the second quarter, New Orleans took the lead as RB Deuce McAllister got a 1-yard TD run.  The Chiefs would answer with rookie kicker Connor Barth getting a 20-yard field goal.  The Saints closed out the half with Hartley making a 23-yard field goal.

In the third quarter, New Orleans increased their lead with QB Drew Brees completing a 47-yard TD pass to WR Lance Moore.  Kansas City replied with Barth making a 21-yard field goal, yet the Saints answered with RB Pierre Thomas getting a 1-yard TD run.  In the fourth quarter, the Chiefs tried to rally as Thigpen hooked up with Bowe again on a 5-yard TD pass.  However, New Orleans pulled away with Hartley nailing a 35-yard field goal.

With their sixth-straight loss, Kansas City fell to 1–9.

Week 12: vs. Buffalo Bills

The Chiefs hosted the 5–5 Bills, losers of their past four games, on November 23. Tyler Thigpen had his first bad game in five outings in the Chiefs' 54–31 loss. Thigpen's three turnovers–two interceptions and one lost fumble–led to 20 points by the Bills. Despite the turnovers, Thigpen also threw for 240 yards and three touchdowns.

The 54 points by Buffalo were the Chiefs' most allowed in a game in the franchise's history. With the loss, the Chiefs fell to a 1–10 record, their 19th loss in 20 games.

Week 13: at Oakland Raiders

The Raiders hosted the Chiefs at Oakland–Alameda County Coliseum on November 30. The game began with both teams exchanging field goals to tie the game at 3. The Raiders lined up to kick another field goal, but instead elected to run a fake field goal, which was fumbled and recovered by Chiefs CB Maurice Leggett and returned for a touchdown. The Chiefs led the game 10–3 at halftime. In the third quarter, the Raiders tied the game at 10 with a touchdown by RB Justin Fargas. With the Chiefs backed up to their own 9 following a punt, QB Tyler Thigpen led the Chiefs's offense down the field and capped the drive with a hand-off to RB Larry Johnson for a 2-yard touchdown. On Oakland's next possession, Justin Fargas fumbled the football which eventually set up a Chiefs field goal. The Raiders attempted to get back in the game with a field goal by K Sebastian Janikowski, but the Chiefs held possession and ran out the clock for the remainder of the game. The Chiefs managed to snap their seven-game losing streak by beating the Raiders 20–13. It was Kansas City's sixth consecutive victory at Oakland–Alameda County Coliseum. The victory was Tyler Thigpen's first as the Chiefs' starting quarterback.

With the win, Kansas City improved to 2–10.

Week 14: at Denver Broncos

Fresh off their divisional road win over the Raiders, the Chiefs flew to Invesco Field at Mile High for a Week 14 AFC West rematch with the Denver Broncos.  In the first quarter, Kansas City got the early lead as rookie kicker Connor Barth got a 26-yard field goal, while rookie CB Maurice Leggett returned an interception 27 yards for a touchdown.  The Broncos would with RB Peyton Hillis getting an 18-yard touchdown run.  The Chiefs answered in the second quarter with QB Tyler Thigpen completing a 13-yard touchdown pass to TE Tony Gonzalez, yet Denver closed out the half with QB Jay Cutler completing a 12-yard touchdown pass to WR Brandon Marshall.

In the third quarter, the Broncos tied the game with kicker Matt Prater nailing a 33-yard field goal.  In the fourth quarter, Denver took the lead as Cutler hooked up with Marshall again on a 6-yard touchdown pass.  Kansas City tried to rally, but the Broncos' defense was too much to overcome.

With the loss, the Chiefs fell to 2–11.

Week 15: vs. San Diego Chargers

The Chiefs hosted the 5–8 Chargers on December 14, hoping to end their slim playoff chances. Temperatures which hovered in the low 60s when early-arriving fans first showed up plunged into the 20s by the end of the game. The Chiefs dominated the game early, leading 14–3 at halftime. Chiefs quarterback Tyler Thigpen threw for one touchdown and ran for another for the Chiefs and was 19-for-28 for 171 yards.

The Chargers had three turnovers and, perhaps more embarrassing, gave up three sacks to the NFL's worst pass rush. Tamba Hali had two sacks and caused two fumbles for a Chiefs defense that hadn't gotten a sack since playing San Diego four games ago. The three sacks pushed Kansas City's season total to a league-low nine, and the Chiefs need five in their last two games to avoid tying the NFL record for fewest in a season. Five of the sacks from the season have come against San Diego.

Leading into the fourth quarter, Kansas City led 21–10, but allowed 11 points in the final 79 seconds of the game to lose 22–21. The Chiefs, despite having an 18-point lead, used up all three time-outs. The victory sealed a season sweep for San Diego over Kansas City, with both victories ending in a one-point margin.

Resignation of Carl Peterson
The day after the Chiefs' loss to San Diego, Chiefs owner Clark Hunt announced the resignation of Carl Peterson from all positions held (general manager, vice president, and chief executive officer) effective at the end of the season.

The official press release stated that Peterson resigned, but Hunt had said the conversation had been on-going throughout the season. Hunt said his decision to relieve Peterson of duties was not based on what happened the previous day, when the Chiefs lost an 11-point lead in the final 73 seconds and were beaten 22–21 by San Diego, dropping their record to 2–12. Hunt also said that the fate of head coach Herman Edwards would be settled after the season. Hunt said he would split the duties previously held by Peterson and have someone in charge of the business side and someone else in charge of football for the franchise. Hunt said he plans on hiring someone from outside the organization.

Week 16: vs. Miami Dolphins

Kansas City hosted the Miami Dolphins in the second-coldest game ever held at Arrowhead Stadium on December 21 with the game-time temperature at 10 °F and a wind chill at −12 °F. It was the coldest conditions that Miami had ever played in. Miami scored first on the opening drive with a touchdown by WR Ted Ginn Jr. Despite trailing 10–0 early in the game, Tyler Thigpen led the Chiefs to a 28–24 lead by halftime. The Chiefs failed to score a touchdown in the second half of the game, only managing a field goal by Connor Barth. The Dolphins broke a 31–31 tie with a touchdown by TE Anthony Fasano with 4:08 remaining in the game. With just over a minute remaining, Chiefs LB Demorrio Williams forced and recovered a fumble to give the Chiefs another chance to tie the game. A failed drive capped off by Thigpen's third interception helped Miami run out the clock. Thigpen threw a career best 320 yards with two touchdowns, but also threw three interceptions. TE Tony Gonzalez became the first Chiefs player and first NFL tight end to record four 1,000 yard receiving seasons. The game also marked the last time Gonzalez played in Arrowhead Stadium as a member of the Chiefs, due to his trade to the Falcons following the season.

Week 17: at Cincinnati Bengals

The Bengals hosted the Chiefs for both teams' final game of the 2008 season on December 28. Entering the game, the Bengals had a 3–11–1 record and the Chiefs had a 2–13 record. While there was speculation over the job status of Herm Edwards as head coach entering the off-season, RB Larry Johnson voiced his intention to seek a trade. Cincinnati completely dominated the game. They outrushed the Chiefs 204 yards to 31 yards. Kansas City could only manage two first downs in the first half.

The Chiefs did not get closer than the Bengals' 37-yard line until their final drive, which ended with TE Tony Gonzalez's 5-yard touchdown catch from QB Tyler Thigpen with 2:20 left in the game. A two-point conversion attempt failed, and the Bengals effectively held the lead for the remainder of the game. The Chiefs' defense had one sack in the game to finish the season with 10–the fewest in the NFL since the league started recording team sacks in 1960. The team surpassed the 1982 Baltimore Colts' record of 11 sacks.

Standings

Season statistics
All statistics through the completion of the 2008 NFL season (December 28, 2008).

Offense
Yards per game: 314.6 (#22 in NFL)

Total yards in season: 4,719 (#22 in NFL)

Points per game: 19.0 (#25 in NFL)

Points in season: 285 (#25 in NFL)

Quarterback rating:
 Tyler Thigpen (11 starts) – 75.8

Rushing yards in season: 1,779 (#11 in NFL)

Rushing yards per game: 118.6 (#11 in NFL)

Passing yards in season: 2,940 (#19 in NFL)

Passing yards per game: 196.0 (#19 in NFL)

Defense
Yards allowed per game: 397.5 (#31 in NFL)

Rushing yards allowed per game: 155.9 (#30 in NFL)

Passing yards allowed per game: 241.5 (#30 in NFL)

Points allowed in season: 424 (#30 in NFL)

Points allowed per game: 28.3 (#30 in NFL)

Fewest quarterback sacks, team: 10 (#32 in NFL–all-time record)

References

Kansas City
Kansas City Chiefs seasons
Kansas